Military Band of the Pacific Fleet is a military band unit of the Pacific Fleet (Russia). It is a branch of the Military Band Service of the Armed Forces of Russia. The Band of the Russian Pacific Fleet was established on May 6, 1860, as a result of an order issued by the Russian Naval Department. The band participates in many military ceremonies, national and religious parades.

Activities 
Today the navy band is one of the main musical symbols of the city of  Vladivostok.

The band takes part in goodwill visits of Russian warships to foreign nations in the Pacific. The band has most notably worked with the navies of the United States, China, South Korea, Vietnam, India, and Japan. Their repertoire includes overtures, rhapsodies, martial music, and songs featuring prominently original jazz, symphonic, and popular music.

Gallery

See also 
 Military Band Service of the Armed Forces of Russia
 Military Band of the Black Sea Fleet
 Pacific Fleet Band

References 

Russian military bands
Military units and formations established in 1860
1860 establishments in the Russian Empire